Ruslan Ismailov (born October 4, 1989) is a Kyrgyz former swimmer, who specialized in freestyle events. Ismailov became one of the youngest swimmers (aged 14) to compete at the 2004 Summer Olympics in Athens, representing his nation Kyrgyzstan. He qualified for the men's 200 m freestyle, by clearing a FINA B-standard entry time of 1:55.06 from the Russian Championships in Moscow. He participated in heat one against two other swimmers Igor Erhartić of Serbia and Montenegro, and Zurab Khomasuridze of Georgia.  Ismailov rounded out the small field of three to last place with a time of 2:01.53, nearly 17 seconds off the world record set by Ian Thorpe in 2001. Ismailov failed to advance into the semifinals, as he placed fifty-ninth overall in the preliminaries.

References

External links
 

1989 births
Living people
Kyrgyzstani male freestyle swimmers
Olympic swimmers of Kyrgyzstan
Swimmers at the 2004 Summer Olympics
Sportspeople from Bishkek
20th-century Kyrgyzstani people
21st-century Kyrgyzstani people